The 1901 Lake Forest football team was an American football team that represented Lake Forest University in the 1901 college football season.  In one of the longest seasons of any college football team in history, Lake Forest compiled a 10–5 record, achieving their first and only ten win season, and outscored their opponents 160 to 89.  Notable games included a 0–16 loss to Notre Dame, who were proclaimed champions of Indiana, and a 0–12 loss to an 8–2–1 Northwestern team.

Schedule

References

Lake Forest
Lake Forest Foresters football seasons
Lake Forest Foresters football